Zaiwa (Tsaiwa, Tsaiva, 载瓦; Burmese: ဇိုင်ဝါး/အဇီး) is a Burmish language spoken in parts of southwest China and eastern Burma. There are around 100,000 speakers. It is also known as Atsi, its name in Jingpo. Other names for the language include Atzi, Azi, Aci, Aji, Atshi, Atsi-Maru, Maru, Zi, Tsaiwa, Szi and Xiaoshanhua. Pela (Bola), with 400 speakers, was once classified as a dialect. From the 1950s Zaiwa was written using the Roman script. A Gospel of Mark was published in Zaiwa in 1938 in the Fraser alphabet and in 1951 in the Roman script.

Distribution
There are more than 70,000 Zaiwa speakers in Yunnan, China, including in:
Bangwa (邦瓦), Longchuan County, Dehong Prefecture
Zhanxi (盏西), Yingjiang County, Dehong Prefecture
Xishan (西山), Mangshi, Dehong Prefecture

The Ethnologue lists Bengwa, Longzhun and Tingzhu as dialects.

In Myanmar, the Sadon (Sadung) dialect is the standard variety.

Tones 
Zaiwa has five tones. Three of these five tones are in unchecked syllables and the remaining two are in checked syllables. The tones are distinguished through a numbering system of one to five; one being the lowest pitch and five the highest pitch.

References

Further reading

 
 
  
 
 
 

Burmish languages
Languages of Myanmar
Languages of China